Nowe Kolnie  is a village in the administrative district of Gmina Lubsza, within Brzeg County, Opole Voivodeship, in south-western Poland.

The village has a population of 150.

References

Nowe Kolnie